Khamba refer to:
Khuman Khamba (also known as Moirang Khamba), a hero in Meitei folklore
Khamba Thoibi, a legendary Meitei language epic poem about Khuman Khamba
Tibetans who live in the historic region of Kham which covers parts of modern Qinghai, Western Sichuan, Northern Yunnan and the Tibet Autonomous Region
Khamba people of Arunachal Pradesh
Gursimran Khamba, Indian Comedian